Dzawuwu Festival is an annual traditional and thanksgiving festival celebrated by the chiefs and people of Agave Traditional Area in Dabala in the Volta Region of Ghana. It is usually celebrated in the month of February.

Celebrations 
During the festival, special portions of food are sprinkled to the gods of the people for protection. Libations are poured and the people renew their loyalty to their rulers.

Significance 
It is celebrated to mark the bravery of the Agaves in the past who fought and won several wars. It is the time to pay homage to those who have departed.

References 

Festivals in Ghana